Gergő Nagy (born 7 January 1993) is a Hungarian football player who  plays for Mezőkövesd.

Club career
In June 2022, Nagy signed with Mezőkövesd.

Club statistics

Updated to games played as of 15 May 2022.

Honours

Honvéd
Nemzeti Bajnokság I: 2016–17
Hungarian Cup: 2019-20

References

External links
MLSZ
HLSZ

1993 births
People from Gyula
Sportspeople from Békés County
Living people
Hungarian footballers
Hungary youth international footballers
Hungary under-21 international footballers
Association football midfielders
Budapest Honvéd FC players
Budapest Honvéd FC II players
Mezőkövesdi SE footballers
Nemzeti Bajnokság I players
Nemzeti Bajnokság II players
Nemzeti Bajnokság III players